Kodiang is a town in Kubang Pasu District, Kedah, Malaysia. It is also a boundary town with Perlis. The name kodiang originates from Thai, khao deng, which means "red hill".

Tourist attractions
 Kerbau Cave

Kubang Pasu District
Towns in Kedah